A light aircraft carrier, or light fleet carrier, is an aircraft carrier that is smaller than the standard carriers of a navy. The precise definition of the type varies by country; light carriers typically have a complement of aircraft only one-half to two-thirds the size of a full-sized fleet carrier. A light carrier was similar in concept to an escort carrier in most respects, however light carriers were intended for higher speeds to be deployed alongside fleet carriers, while escort carriers usually defended equally slow convoys and provided air support during amphibious operations.

History

In World War II (WWII), the United States Navy produced a number of light carriers by converting cruiser hulls. These s, converted from  light cruisers, were unsatisfactory ships for aviation with their narrow, short decks and slender, high-sheer hulls; in virtually all respects the escort carriers were superior aviation vessels. In addition, they had enough speed to take part in fleet actions with the larger carriers while escort carriers did not. Two vessels in this class— and —were completed after the war's end. After very brief lives as carriers, the Saipans were converted to command and communication ships.

By the start of WWII, the Royal Navy's , the first purpose-built aircraft carrier (launched 1919, sunk 1942) was being considered as equivalent to a light aircraft carrier, due to her small size, small aircraft complement and lack of armour. The British 1942 design light fleet carrier, originally designated the Colossus class, was a scaled-down version of their  fleet carrier. The design could be built in a yard with little or no experience of warship construction. Although built to merchant standards, the design incorporated better watertight subdivision. Expected to have a lifetime of about three years, the last of the design was taken out of service in 2001. The first ten were built as the Colossus class, though two of these were modified whilst under construction into aircraft maintenance carriers. An additional five carriers, none of which were completed in time for service in WWII, were built with revisions upgrading the design to handle larger and heavier aircraft, receiving the designation Majestic class.  In the post-war period, the Royal Navy operated a force of the ten Colossus carriers, while the five Majestic carriers were sold, during construction, to Australia, Canada and India. The Majestics were followed, after the war, by the four light carriers of the Centaur class.

In the 1970s the RN introduced a new type of light carrier, designed to operate the V/STOL Hawker Siddeley Harrier. Originally classed as "through-deck cruisers," the three-ship Invincible class served into the early 21st century; HMS Invincible was key to the British victory in the Falklands War.

List of light carriers
 Argentina
  (Colossus class)
  (Colossus class)
 Australia
  (Majestic class)
 HMAS Vengeance (Colossus class)
  (Majestic class)
 Canada
  (Colossus class)
  (Majestic class)
  (Majestic class)
 Brazil
  (Colossus class)
 France
 Lafayette class (ex-Independence class):
 
 
   (Colossus class)
 Japan
 
 
 
 
 
 
 
 
 
 India
  (Majestic class)
  (Centaur class)
 Italy
 
 
 Netherlands
  (Colossus class)
 Spain
  (Independence class)
 
 Thailand
 
 Turkey
 TCG Anadolu
 United Kingdom
 
 
 1942 Design Light Fleet Carrier
 Colossus class
 
 
 
 
 
  (maintenance carrier)
 
 
 
  (maintenance carrier)
 Majestic class (none saw service in the Royal Navy)
 Majestic (entered service as HMAS Melbourne)
 Terrible (entered service as HMAS Sydney)
 Magnificent (entered service as HMCS Magnificent)
 Hercules (entered service as INS Vikrant)
 Powerful (entered service as HMCS Bonaventure)
 
 
 
 
 
  
 
 
 
 United States

See also
 Anti-submarine warfare carrier
 Escort carrier
 Helicopter carrier
 Amphibious assault ship
 List of aircraft carriers of the Second World War
 List of escort aircraft carriers of the Second World War

Notes

References
 
 
 

Light aircraft carrier classes
Aircraft carriers by type